Steinar Aulie (born 6 September 1959) is a Norwegian footballer. He played in one match for the Norway national football team in 1982.

References

External links
 
 

1959 births
Living people
Norwegian footballers
Norway international footballers
Place of birth missing (living people)
Association football defenders
Mjøndalen IF players